Rychnovek is a municipality and village in Náchod District in the Hradec Králové Region of the Czech Republic. It has about 600 inhabitants.

Administrative parts
Villages of Doubravice u České Skalice and Zvole are administrative parts of Rychnovek.

References

Villages in Náchod District